Nattapong Phephat (born 13 November 1995) is a Thai professional footballer who plays as a left-back for Thai League 2 club  Samut Prakan City.

References

External links
 

1995 births
Living people
Nattapong Phephat
Association football defenders
Nattapong Phephat
Nattapong Phephat
Nattapong Phephat